Elizabeth Owens (born 2 January 1963 in Dublin) is an Irish cricketer. She was a right-handed batsman as well as right-arm medium-fast. She is sister of Stella Owens.

References

1963 births
Living people
Irish women cricketers
Ireland women One Day International cricketers
Cricketers from Dublin (city)
Irish women cricket captains